St. Catharine Church is a Roman Catholic church in Spring Lake, New Jersey.  Built in 1901, it has been described by the Monmouth County Historical Commission as "the finest high-style example of Classical Revival architecture in Monmouth County."  Its interior is decorated with 27 canvas and fresco paintings by Gonippo Raggi, both replicas and original work, as well as Irish-themed murals which were made by Raggi and Chicago-based artist Thomas O'Shaughnessy.

References

External links
 

Roman Catholic churches in New Jersey
Churches in Monmouth County, New Jersey
Spring Lake, New Jersey
Churches completed in 1901
Neoclassical architecture in New Jersey
Neoclassical church buildings in the United States